Hungarian Brazilians ( or) are Brazilians of full, partial, or predominantly Hungarian ancestry, or Hungarian-born people who emigrated to Brazil.

According to the Embassy of Hungary to Brazil, there are between 80,000 and 100,000 Brazilians of Hungarian descent, most of them living in São Paulo and 8-10% living in Rio de Janeiro.

History 

The Hungarian brothers João Carlos and Francisco Hofbauer (Portuguese written) came to Brazil from the city of Győr in 1826, escaping from political persecution. By the time they arrived in Brazil, they changed their surnames from Hofbauer to Hungria (Hungary, in Portuguese), founding the Hungria family in Brazil.

There is also the former Hungarian Baptist Church, that recently changed its name to Igreja Batista Metropolitana, in the Lapa neighborhood of São Paulo, on Pio XI street. A large Hungarian community erected this church in the mid 20th century, and held services in Hungarian until 1998. Today all services are in Portuguese, but a few descendants of the Hungarian community still can be seen in this church.

Notable Hungarian Brazilians

Adriane Galisteu
Alexander Lenard
Cássia Kiss
Dalton Vigh
Gastão Rosenfeld
Ilona Szabó de Carvalho
Kevin Kurányi
Paulo Miklos
Paulo Rónai
Rafael Lusvarghi
Roberto Justus

See also
 Brazil–Hungary relations
 Immigration to Brazil
 White Brazilians
 Hungarian people

References

Brazilian people of Hungarian descent
European Brazilian
Brazilians